The 2023 Denver mayoral election will be held on April 4, 2023 to elect the mayor of Denver, Colorado, with a runoff on June 6 if necessary. The election is officially nonpartisan and will be held concurrently with elections for the Denver City Council, as well as Denver's City Auditor and City Clerk and Recorder. Incumbent Democratic mayor Michael Hancock is term-limited and cannot seek re-election to a fourth term in office. A historic field of seventeen candidates filed to run in the race to succeed Hancock.

Candidates

Declared
The following candidates qualified to appear on the ballot.

Renate Behrens, retired caretaker
Kelly Brough, former CEO of the Denver Metro Chamber of Commerce and former chief of staff to then-mayor John Hickenlooper (Party affiliation: Democratic)
Lisa Calderón, executive director of Emerge Colorado, former chief of staff to city councilor Candi CdeBaca, and candidate for mayor in 2019 (Party affiliation: Democratic)
Al Gardner, information technology professional and member of the Denver Civil Service Commission (Party affiliation: Democratic)
Chris Hansen, state senator (Party affiliation: Democratic)
Leslie Herod, state representative (Party affiliation: Democratic)
Mike Johnston, former state senator, candidate for governor in 2018, and candidate for U.S. Senate in 2020 (Party affiliation: Democratic)
Aurelio Martinez, tech worker and former boxer
Debbie Ortega, at-large city councilor (Party affiliation: Democratic)
Terrance Roberts, community organizer (Party affiliation: Democratic)
Trinidad Rodriguez, financing executive and former Denver Housing Authority commissioner
Andy Rougeot, maintenance executive (Party affiliation: Republican)
Ean Tafoya, community organizer and former co-chair of the Colorado Environmental Justice Action Task Force (Party affiliation: Democratic)
Robert Treta, property builder (Party affiliation: Independent)
James Walsh, University of Colorado Denver professor
Thomas Wolf, investment banker and candidate for mayor in 2011

Disqualified
Abass Bamba, data consulting firm president (running as a write-in candidate)
Matt Brady (running as a write-in candidate)
Alex Cowans
Paul Fiorino, dance teacher and perennial candidate (Party affiliation: Independent) (running as a write-in candidate)
Sean Gallegos
Marcus Giavanni, perennial candidate (running as a write-in candidate)
Sylvia Herring
Jesse Parris, community organizer (running as a write-in candidate)
Ken Simpson, tech consultant and perennial candidate

Withdrew
Anna Burrell, sustainability consulting executive (endorsed Calderón)
Kwame Spearman, CEO of Tattered Cover (remained on ballot; endorsed Brough)
David Stevens, language tutoring school founder
Alex Valdez, state representative (Party affiliation: Democratic)

Declined
Auon'tai Anderson, vice president of the Denver Public Schools Board (running for re-election)
Albus Brooks, construction executive and former city councilor for district 9 (endorsed Johnston)
Candi CdeBaca, city councilor for district 9 (Party affiliation: Democratic) (running for re-election, endorsed Calderón)
Stephan Evans, activist and candidate for mayor in 2015 and 2019
Kevin Flynn, city councilor for district 2 (Party affiliation: Democratic) (running for re-election)
Alec Garnett, former Speaker of the Colorado House of Representatives (Party affiliation: Democratic)
Stacie Gilmore, city councilor and former council president (Party affiliation: Democratic) (running for re-election)
Cary Kennedy, senior advisor to governor Jared Polis, former Colorado State Treasurer, former deputy mayor of Denver, and candidate for governor in 2018 (Party affiliation: Democratic)
Robin Kniech, at-large city councilor (Party affiliation: Democratic)
James Mejia, president of Denver Film and candidate for mayor in 2011
Tim O'Brien, Denver City Auditor (running for re-election)
Paul Pazen, former chief of the Denver Police Department
Penfield Tate III, former state senator and candidate for mayor in 2003 and 2019 (Party affiliation: Democratic) (running for city council)

Fundraising

Endorsements

Polling

Results

Notes

References

External links 
Official campaign websites 
 Kelly Brough (D) for Mayor
 Lisa Calderón (D) for Mayor
 Al Gardner (D) for Mayor
 Marcus Giavanni for Mayor
 Chris Hansen (D) for Mayor
 Leslie Herod (D) for Mayor
 Mike Johnston (D) for Mayor
 Aurelio Martinez for Mayor
 Debbie Ortega (D) for Mayor
 Terrance Roberts (D) for Mayor
 Trinidad Rodriguez for Mayor
 Andy Rougeot (R) for Mayor
 Kwame Spearman (D) for Mayor
 Ean Tafoya (D) for Mayor
 Robert Treta (I) for Mayor
 James Walsh for Mayor
 Thomas Wolf for Mayor

Mayoral elections in Denver
Denver
2023 Colorado elections